Astrid Blume (May 12, 1872 – 1924) was a Danish educator and temperance advocate.

Biography
Astrid Blume was born in Jutland, May 12, 1872. She was president of the Danish branch of the World's Woman's Christian Temperance Union and editor of its organ from 1905 to 1915. She also served as a member of the executive committee of the Young Woman's Christian Association of Denmark. She was principal of the Indre Mission's Women's Seminary at Aarhus, Denmark.

Blume died in 1924.

References

1872 births
1924 deaths
Jutland
Woman's Christian Temperance Union people
YWCA leaders
Danish educators
Danish temperance activists
Social reformers
Danish magazine editors
Danish women editors